Dongsheng Township is a township in west-central Heilongjiang province, China, located about  east of Bei'an, which administers it., it has 5 villages under its administration.

See also 
 List of township-level divisions of Heilongjiang

References 

Township-level divisions of Heilongjiang
Heihe